Ovsinjinac is a village situated in Gadžin Han municipality in Serbia.

References

Populated places in Nišava District